Waldshut is an electoral constituency (German: Wahlkreis) represented in the Bundestag. It elects one member via first-past-the-post voting. Under the current constituency numbering system, it is designated as constituency 288. It is located in southwestern Baden-Württemberg, comprising the Waldshut district and the eastern part of the Breisgau-Hochschwarzwald district.

Waldshut was created for the 1965 federal election. Since 2017, it has been represented by Felix Schreiner of the Christian Democratic Union (CDU).

Geography
Waldshut is located in southwestern Baden-Württemberg. As of the 2021 federal election, it comprises the district of Waldshut and the municipalities of Breitnau, Buchenbach, Eisenbach (Hochschwarzwald), Feldberg (Schwarzwald), Friedenweiler, Glottertal, Gundelfingen, Heuweiler, Hinterzarten, Kirchzarten, Lenzkirch, Löffingen, Oberried, St. Märgen, St. Peter, Schluchsee, Stegen, and Titisee-Neustadt from the Breisgau-Hochschwarzwald district.

History
Waldshut was created in 1965. In the 1965 through 1976 elections, it was constituency 188 in the numbering system. In the 1980 through 1998 elections, it was number 192. In the 2002 and 2005 elections, it was number 289. Since the 2009 election, it has been number 288.

Originally, the constituency comprised the districts of Waldshut, Hochschwarzwald, and Säckingen. In the 1980 through 1998 elections, it comprised the district of Waldshut and the municipalities of Breitnau, Eisenbach, Feldberg, Friedenweiler, Hinterzarten, Lenzkirch, Löffingen, Schluchsee, and Titisee-Neustadt from the Breisgau-Hochschwarzwald district. It acquired its current borders in the 2002 election.

Members
The constituency has been held continuously by Christian Democratic Union (CDU) since its creation. It was first represented by Anton Hilbert from 1965 to 1969. Former Chancellor Kurt Georg Kiesinger was representative from 1969 to 1976. Norbert Nothhelfer served from 1976 to 1980, followed by Werner Dörflinger from 1980 to 1998. Thomas Dörflinger was representative from 1998 to 2017. Felix Schreiner was elected in 2017 and re-elected in 2021.

Election results

2021 election

2017 election

2013 election

2009 election

Notes

References

Federal electoral districts in Baden-Württemberg
1965 establishments in West Germany
Constituencies established in 1965
Waldshut (district)
Breisgau-Hochschwarzwald